The twenty-ninth Connecticut House of Representatives district elects one member of the Connecticut House of Representatives. Its current representative is Kerry Szeps-Wood. The district consists of the town of Rocky Hill, the historical base of the district in which all representatives since 1975 have lived, and parts of the towns of Newington, which is split between the 24th, 27th and 29th districts, and Wethersfield, which is split between the 28th and 29th districts. Until boundary changes that took effect for the 2002 election, a small portion of the city of Hartford was a part of the district and the portion of Newington currently within the 29th district was a part of the 27th district.

List of representatives

Recent elections

External links 
 Google Maps - Connecticut House Districts

References

29
Rocky Hill, Connecticut
Newington, Connecticut
Wethersfield, Connecticut